Micropterix is a genus of small primitive metallic moths, in the family Micropterigidae within the insect order Lepidoptera. The name was raised by the German entomologist, Jacob Hübner in 1825 and comes from the Greek for mikros, little and pterux, a wing. The moths are distributed across Europe, south to North Africa and east as far as Japan.

Description
The moths are small, with the forewing ranging in size from 2.5 mm to 5.5 mm, and at rest they are held at a steep angle, tent-like over the body. Members of the family to which this genus belongs are unique among the Lepidoptera in having chewing mouthparts rather than a proboscis. They are often seen feeding, often in large aggregations, on the pollen of the flowers of many herbaceous plants, shrubs and trees. Eggs are translucent white and laid amongst vegetation on the surface of the soil.The life history of the early stages is more or less unknown but larva have been found in the young shoots of plants, or obtained by the funnel extraction of woodland turf samples, from a depth of up to 10 cm. It appears there are only three instars and they probably feed on minute particles of leaf-litter or possibly fungal hyphae.For many species the pupa is unknown, but of those found it is within a tough silken cocoon.

Edward Meyrick describes the moth as:Mandibles developed. No tongue. Labial palpi obsolete. Posterior tibiae with spurs placed in groups of bristles. Forewings: vein 7 to costa, vein 11 connected by bar with vein 12, 12 giving rise to an additional vein (13) about middle. Hindwings as forewings, but vein 13 usually absent.

Species 
Micropterix contains the following species:

Micropterix abchasiae
Micropterix agenjoi
Micropterix aglaella
Micropterix algeriella
Micropterix allionella
Micropterix amasiella
Micropterix amsella
†Micropterix anglica
Micropterix aruncella
Micropterix aureatella
Micropterix aureocapilla
Micropterix aureofasciella
Micropterix aureopennella
Micropterix aureoviridella
Micropterix avarcella
Micropterix balcanica Heath (manuscript name)
Micropterix berytella
Micropterix calthella
Micropterix carthaginiensis
Micropterix cassinella
Micropterix completella
Micropterix conjunctella
Micropterix constantinella
Micropterix corcyrella
Micropterix cornuella
Micropterix croatica
Micropterix cyaneochrysa
Micropterix cypriensis
Micropterix eatoniella
Micropterix elegans
Micropterix emiliensis
Micropterix erctella
Micropterix facetella
Micropterix fasciata Heath (manuscript name)
Micropterix fenestrellensis
Micropterix garganoensis
Micropterix gaudiella
†Micropterix gertraudae
Micropterix granatensis
Micropterix hartigi
Micropterix herminiella
Micropterix huemeri
Micropterix hyrcana
Micropterix ibericella
Micropterix igaloensis
†Micropterix immensipalpa
Micropterix imperfectella
Micropterix inornatus Heath (manuscript name)
Micropterix islamella
Micropterix isobasella
Micropterix italica
Micropterix jabalmoussae
Micropterix jacobella
(Micropterix jeanneli) (either treated as a synonym or valid species)
Micropterix kardamylensis
Micropterix klimeschi
Micropterix lagodechiella
Micropterix lakoniensis
Micropterix lambesiella
Micropterix longicornuella
Micropterix mansuetella
Micropterix maschukella
Micropterix minimella
Micropterix montanella
Micropterix monticolella
Micropterix montosiella
Micropterix myrtetella
Micropterix osthelderi
Micropterix paykullella
Micropterix purpureopennella
Micropterix rablensis
Micropterix renatae
Micropterix rothenbachii
Micropterix schaefferi
Micropterix sicanella
Micropterix sikhotealinensis
Micropterix staudinger Heath (manuscript name)
Micropterix stuebneri
Micropterix trifasciella
Micropterix trinacriella
Micropterix tunbergella
Micropterix turkmeniella
Micropterix tuscaniensis
Micropterix uxoria
Micropterix vulturensis
Micropterix wockei
Micropterix zangheriella

References

External links
 
 

Micropterigidae
Moth genera
Taxa named by Jacob Hübner